Mary Jane Lewis may refer to:
Mary Jane Croft (1916–1999), American actress also known as Mary Jane Lewis
Mary Jane Innes (1852–1941), New Zealand brewery manager with the maiden name Lewis

See also  
 Mary Lewis (disambiguation)